American International School of Niamey is an American international school in Niamey, Niger. It serves grades pre-Kindergarten through 12th grade. The school was established in 1982.

See also
 Lycée La Fontaine (Niger) - French school

References

External links
 American International School of Niamey

International schools in Niger
American international schools in Africa
Schools in Niamey
1982 establishments in Niger
Educational institutions established in 1982